Iditol is a sugar alcohol which accumulates in galactokinase deficiency.

See also
Idose
Aldose reductase
L-iditol 2-dehydrogenase

References

External links

Sugar alcohols